Kamli is a 2006 Telugu film directed by K. N. T. Sastry. The film stars Nandita Das in the title role of a Lambada girl. The film's lyrics were written by Suddala Ashok Teja. The film was showcased at the Busan International Film Festival in Korea and the Asian Film Festival in Mumbai.

Plot
Kamli tackles the issues of the sale of the girl child (rampant in the community) and the swapping of the male child, a practice fairly common in the urban areas—particularly in the hospitals.

Kamli (Nandita Das) is the focal point of the tale. She is forced to sell her firstborn girl. It is a well-known fact that the girl child is not welcome in most Indian communities and amongst the Lambadas she is considered an ill omen. The boys are wanted as they feed their parents. One gets a peek into her life, how she is married to Redya (Shafi), her toil for a job, how she puts up with an alcoholic husband, how she faces the 'contractors' and other men folk who have lecherous designs on her and so on.

When she delivers a male child, her infant is swapped and a girl child is placed instead. This incident forces her to fight for her son. The media's role (in the building of hype of Kamli's fight), her dharna and the subsequent outcome with some melodrama are portrayed in a stereotypical manner.

Cast 
 Nandita Das as Kamli
 Tanikella Bharani as Badya
 Shafi as Redya
 L.B. Sriram as Police Constable
 Roopa Devi as Ramli
 Kota Shankar Rao as Supervisor
 Y. K. Nageswara Rao as Supervisor
 Pavala Syamala as Ayah
 Vijayalakshmi as Cobbler
 Satyapriya as Doctor
 Bharati as Tribal Neighbor
 Lakshmi as Tribal Neighbor
 Sudhakar as Security
 Tadivelu as Tea Master
 Ashalatha
 Damodar
 Srinivasa Rao
 Kalachandra

Awards
National Film Award for Best Feature Film in Telugu
Nandi Award for Best Actress

Inspiration
Kamli was inspired by a K.N.T. Sastry's award-winning documentary harvesting babies. Sastry wanted to make a feature film based on the documentary about the plight of tribal women selling their babies for a pittance. He contacted and wanted to film with Soundarya as the main female lead of Kamli, but she died in a helicopter crash, and the role went to Nandita Das.

References

External links
http://www.rediff.com/movies/2006/nov/24kamli.htm

2000s Telugu-language films
2006 films
Best Telugu Feature Film National Film Award winners